Fulcrifera periculosa is a species of moth of the family Tortricidae. It is found in the Democratic Republic of Congo, Kenya and South Africa.

References

Moths described in 1913
Grapholitini